(styled in allcaps) is the first mini-album of Yoh Kamiyama, released independently under e.w.e. label name on April 3, 2019.

Summary 
This is the first Kamiyama's album under his real name, after working as vocaloid producer under his pseudonym, Yuukisan.

In the crossfade, voice-actor Hiroshi Kamiya participated as narrator.

On January 8, 2020 this album released digitally along with the pre-release of Gunjō.

Chart 
This album reached #16 on Oricon album chart on April 15, 2019.

Track listing 
Catalog number:

 Regular Edition - KMYM-001
 YELLOW cover Edition - KMYM-002
 Aoitoge cover Edition - KMYM-003

References

External links 

 Yoh Kamiyama 1st mini Album Shiawase na Otona on official web site
 Yoh Kamiyama 1st mini Album Shiawase na Otona Crossfade

2019 EPs